Shri Bhagwan Singh Kushwaha is a politician from Bihar, who has also served as a minister in the Government of Bihar. He is a son-in-law of Jagdish Mahto, the founder of Naxalism in Ekwari village of the Bhojpur region of Bihar. He has assumed several important posts in various regional political parties of Bihar, which includes Communist Party of India (Marxist–Leninist), Rashtriya Janata Dal, Janata Dal (United), Lok Janshakti Party, Jan Adhikar Party and Rashtriya Lok Samata Party. Kushwaha once headed JD(U)'s youth wing and has also been Minister for rural development in Bihar.

Life and career
Bhagwan Singh is a son of Devdhari Singh, who hails from Jagdishpur in Arrah district of Bihar. In the early part of his life he has been associated with the social work before entering the politics. His spouse is a government servant. He has been educated till matriculation level and has been charged with several criminal cases as per his affidavit submitted to Election Commission of India. In the affidavit, he reveals the charges lodged against him which includes murder, attempt to murder, rioting and possession of harmful weapons. Bhagwan Singh contests the election to Bihar Legislative Assembly from the Jagdishpur constituency. He started his political career from the Indian People's Front, which came to be known as CPI-ML later. In 1990, he was elected from the Jagdishpur constituency to the legislative assembly as the CPI-ML candidate but in the next election the seat was won by Harinarayan Singh of Janata Dal, but Bhagwan was reelected in 2000 from this seat, this time on the ticket of Samata Party (now led by Uday Mandal its President). After the formation of Janata Dal (United) from the Samata Party, Bhagwan was elected once again in 2005 with the new party from the Jagdishpur seat.

The dormant political career of Bhagwan Singh was boosted once again after Upendra Kushwaha formed Rashtriya Lok Samata Party in 2013 as a result of split in the ruling JD(U). To bring all Kushwaha leaders under one umbrella for better political outcomes, some of the old politicians were given high posts in the newly formed party, which included Bhagwan Singh, who was made party's vice president. In 2018, Upendra Kushwaha, the founder of Rashtriya Lok Samata Party, left the Bharatiya Janata Party led National Democratic Alliance, which was seen by many of his party members as a suicidal step. Bhagwan Singh too protested against this decision and left RLSP to join the JD(U) with 35 state level office bearers and at least 1200 workers of the party. The exit of Bhagwan Singh was preceded by the exit of other legislators of the party which included Sudhanshu Shekhar and Lalan Paswan. In the presence of JD(U)'s contemporary state president, Bashistha Narain Singh, Kushwaha hailed his decision to part his ways with RLSP.

In October 2020, before the Bihar Assembly elections, he was found to be involved in anti-party activities after he was denied ticket by the JDU in the assembly elections. As a result of this, he along with some of the former leaders of the party were ousted for a period of 6 years. Among those who were expelled was the former Member of Legislative Assembly, Dadan Pahalwan.

2020 assembly elections
In 2020 elections to Bihar Legislative Assembly, after being denied ticket from JD(U), he contested from the Lok Janshakti Party in the Jagdishpur constituency. In a tripartite battle between JDU, Rashtriya Janata Dal and Lok Janshakti Party, he lost to Ram Vishun Singh of RJD. Among the three key candidates, he was able to secure second position between the winner and Sushmlata Kushwaha, the third runner up.

Return to JDU

After unsuccessfully contesting Jagdishpur seat on LJP ticket in 2020 assembly election, he once again returned to JDU in August, 2021.

References

External links
Facebook

Janata Dal (United) politicians
Rashtriya Lok Samata politicians
Samata Party politicians
Year of birth missing (living people)
Living people